Journal of Anxiety Disorders is a bimonthly peer-reviewed interdisciplinary academic journal publishing research on all aspects of anxiety disorders across the lifespan (child, adolescent, adult, and geriatric populations). Gordon J. G. Asmundson (University Regina) serves as the Editor-In-Chief of the journal with associate editors Lauren S. Hallion (University of Pittsburgh), Alexendre Heeren (Catholic University of Louvain), Peter McEvoy (Curtin University), Carmen McLean (VA National Centre for Post Traumatic Stress Disorder), Michelle G. Newman (Pennsylvania State University), and Jasper A. Smits (University of Texas). The Journal of Anxiety Disorders has a Cite Score of 6.6 and an impact factor of 5.264 (2020) ranking it 17th out of 131 journals in clinical psychology.

Scope of the journal
A diverse range of topics are covered as they relate to anxiety disorders and is inclusive of disorders that were previously categorized as anxiety related disorders (obsessive-compulsive disorder, posttraumatic stress disorder) in addition to the new category of illness anxiety disorder. The journal publishes across a variety of disciplines with the inclusion of research on traditional, behavioural, cognitive, and biological assessment; diagnosis and classification, psychosocial and psychopharmacological treatment, genetics, epidemiology, and prevention. Theoretical and review articles contributing to the advancement of knowledge in the field are also considered.

Indexing of publications
The Journal of Anxiety Disorders is indexed in nine international databases to promote international knowledge translation with inclusion in Elsevier BIOBASE, PubMed/ Medline, PsycINFO, BIOSIS Citation Index, BRS Data, Current Contents – Social & Behavioral Sciences, Pascal Francis, Google Scholar, and Scopus.

Diversity, equity, and inclusion
In August 2021, the Journal of Anxiety Disorders pledged its commitment to improving the diversity of their editorial board and contributors while also making it a priority to increase attention to culture and diversity in the published research. 50% of the senior editors are women and data from January 2021 indicates approximately 30% of the editorial board were women. The journal has made it a priority for 2021–2022 to work towards increasing the representation of women on the editorial board with aim of reaching 50% by June 2022. With equal priority, the journal seeks to increase global balance of their editorial board and contributors to the journal over the next several years. The pledge and associated aims by the Journal of Anxiety Disorders aligns with Elsevier's broader ongoing equity, diversity, and inclusion efforts as it is critical for these factors to be considered in achieving scientific excellence, innovation, and advancement. The journal believes in the power of an inclusive publishing environment not only to do what is right but to enrich, strengthen, and advance us all.

Members of Editorial Board

Jonathan S. Abramowitz (University of North Carolina at Chapel Hill), USA
Ron Acierno (Medical University of South Carolina), USA
Lynne E. Alden (University of British Columbia), Canada
Ananda Amstadter (Virginia Commonwealth University), USA
Courtney Beard (Harvard Medical School), USA
J. Gayle Beck (University of Memphis), USA
Eni S. Becker (Radboud University), Netherlands
Deborah C. Beidel (University of Central Florida), USA
Julia D. Buckner (Louisiana State University), USA
L. Levin Chapman (Private Practice, Louisville), USA
Meredith E. Coles (SUNY *College of Environmental Science and Forestry Department), USA
Jonathan S. Comer (Florida International University), USA
Jesse Cougle (Florida State University), USA
Thompson Davis III (Louisiana State University), USA
Gretchen Diefenbach (Anxiety Disorders Center), USA
Laura J. Dixon (University of Mississippi), USA
Jon D. Elhai (University of Toledo), USA
Matthew T. Feldner (University of Arkansas), USA
Robert F. Ferdinand (GGZ Defland), Netherlands
Thomas A. Fergus (Baylor University), USA
Brian Fisak (University of North Florida), USA
Christopher A. Flessner (Kent State University), USA
Luis Joaquin Garcia-Lopez (University of Jaen), Spain
Anouk Grubaugh (Medical University of South Carolina), USA
Heather Hadjistavropoulos (University of Regina), Canada
Brian Hall (New York University Shanghai), China
Richard Heimberg (Temple University), USA
Charmaine Higa-McMillan (University of Hawaii at Hilo), USA
Stefan Hofmann (Boston University), USA
Jonathan Huppert (Hebrew University of Jerusalem), Israel
Dawn M. Johnson (University of Akron), USA
Christopher A. Kearney (University of Nevada), USA
Philip C. Kendall (Temple University), USA
Steven R. Lawyer (Idaho State University), USA
Carrie Masia-Warner (New York University), USA
Dean McKay (Fordham University), USA
Richard J. McNally (Harvard University), USA
Jan Mohlman (William Paterson University of New Jersey), USA
Leslie A. Morland (University of California System), USA
Thomas H. Ollendick (Virginia Polytechnic Institute and State University), USA
Nnmadi Pole (Smith College), USA
Sheila Rauch (Emory University School of Medicine), USA
Thomas L. Rodebaugh (Washington University), USA
Josef I. Rusek (VA Palo Alto Healthcare System Menlo Park Division), USA
Norman B. Schmidt (Tallahassee), USA
Tyler C. Smith (National University School of Health and Human Services), USA
Eric A. Storch (Baylor College of Medicine), USA
Charles T. Taylor (University of California San Diego), USA
Steven Taylor (University of British Columbia), Canada
Ellen Teng (Baylor College of Medicine), USA
Matthew T. Tull (University of Toledo), USA
David Valentiner (Northern Illinois University), USA
Enrique Varela (Loyala University New Orleans), USA
Andres G. Viana (University of Houston), USA
Li Wang (Chinese Academy of Sciences), China
Carl F. Weems (Iowa State University), USA
Stephen Whiteside (Mayo Clinic), USA
Janet Woodruff-Borden (University of Louisville), USA
Kevin Wu (Northern Illinois University), USA
Michael J. Zvolensky (University of Houston), USA

External links

Anxiety disorders
Elsevier academic journals
Publications established in 1987
Psychiatry journals
English-language journals
Bimonthly journals
Abnormal psychology journals